Jamalpur Mallikarjun (born 14 October 1993) is an Indian cricketer. He made his Twenty20 debut for Hyderabad in the 2018–19 Syed Mushtaq Ali Trophy on 2 March 2019. He made his List A debut on 28 September 2019, for Hyderabad in the 2019–20 Vijay Hazare Trophy. He made his first-class debut on 3 January 2020, for Hyderabad in the 2019–20 Ranji Trophy.

References

External links
 

1993 births
Living people
Indian cricketers
Hyderabad cricketers
Place of birth missing (living people)